The Bear Flag is the official flag of the U.S. state of California. The precursor of the flag was first flown during the 1846 Bear Flag Revolt and was also known as the Bear Flag. A predecessor, called the Lone Star Flag, was used in an 1836 independence movement; the red star element from that flag appears in the Bear Flag of today.

Current flag

Law and protocol
The 1911 statute stated:

In 1953, the design and specifications for the state flag were standardized in a bill signed by Governor Earl Warren and illustrated by Donald Graeme Kelley of Marin County, California. The California state flag is often called the "Bear Flag" and in fact, the present statute adopting the flag, California Government Code § 420, states: "The Bear Flag is the State Flag of California."

Pursuant to Section 439 of the California Government Code, the regulations and protocols for the proper display of the flag of California is controlled by the California Adjutant General:

When the flag is displayed vertically, it is rotated 90 degrees clockwise such that the bear and star face upward and red stripe is on the left.

The flag is also used as the state ensign.

Design

The first official version of the Bear Flag was adopted by the California State Legislature and signed into law by Governor Hiram Johnson in 1911 as the official state flag.

The contemporary state flag is white with a wide red strip along the bottom. There is a red star in the upper left corner and a grizzly bear facing left (toward the hoist) in the center, walking on a patch of green grass. The size of the bear is 2/3 the size of the hoist width and has a ratio of 2 by 1. The grass plot has a ratio of 11 to 1.  The five-point star is taken from the California Lone Star Flag of 1836. The hoist of the flag is two-thirds the fly.

The bear on one 1911 version of the flag is claimed to have been modeled on the last California grizzly bear in captivity. The bear, named "Monarch", was captured in 1889 by newspaper reporter Allan Kelly, at the behest of William Randolph Hearst. The bear was subsequently moved to Woodwards Gardens in San Francisco, and then to the zoo at Golden Gate Park. After the bear's death in 1911, it was mounted and preserved at the Academy of Sciences at Golden Gate Park.

While the bear flag was adopted in 1911, until 1953 the image of the bear varied depending on the flag manufacturer, and was finally standardized based on an image of Monarch. In 1953 the bear image was standardized based on an 1855 watercolor by Charles Christian Nahl. The 1953 law includes an official black and white rendering of the bear as well as the plot of grass and brown tufts. This drawing and other specifications that define the flag's colors and dimensions are identified as "54-J-03".

The Californian flag is one of two U.S. state flags to feature a bear, the other being that of Missouri.

In 2001, the North American Vexillological Association surveyed its members on the designs of the 72 U.S. state, U.S. territorial, and Canadian provincial flags and ranked the flag of California 13th.

Colors

The 1953 legislation defined the exact shades of the California flag with a total of five colors (including the white field) relative to the 9th edition of the Standard Color Card of America (now called the Standard Color Reference of America). It is one of only four US state flags that does not contain the color blue (the other three are Alabama, Maryland, and New Mexico).

 Seal is used for the dark shading of the bear, the 12 darker tufts in the plot of grass, the border of the plot and the lettering "CALIFORNIA REPUBLIC".
 Maple Sugar is the base color for the bear.
 Old Glory Red is used for the star, the bear's tongue and the red stripe at the bottom of the flag.
 Irish Green is used for the grass plot.
 The bear's claws are also accented with white. The left front and rear paws have four white claws while the right rear claw displays three. The front right paw does not contain highlighting.

History

Lone Star of California

In 1836, a coup led by Juan Alvarado declared Alta California's independence from Mexico. Declaring himself governor, Alvarado recruited U.S. frontiersmen, led by Isaac Graham, to support him. The rebels easily captured the capital Monterey, but were unable to convince southern leaders such as Juan Bandini and Carlos Antonio Carrillo to join the rebellion. Faced with a civil war, Alvarado and the other Californios negotiated a compromise with the central government wherein California's leaders accepted its status as a "department" under the "Siete Leyes" Mexican constitution of 1836, in return for more local control. Alvarado was appointed governor the next year.

The Lone Star Flag of California, associated with Alvarado's rebellion, contained a single red star on a white background. One last original flag is archived at the Autry National Center.

Original Bear Flag

The original grizzly bear flag was created by Peter Storm.  A version of this bear flag, designed by William L. Todd, was raised in Sonoma, California, in June 1846 on a date between the 14th and the 17th, by the men who became known as the "Bear Flaggers", including William B. Ide. The exact creation date is at least somewhat unclear.  However, U.S. Naval Lieutenant John Missroon reported the flag's existence as of June 17, 1846.

William L. Todd was a cousin of Mary Todd Lincoln. According to the book Flags Over California, published by the California Military Department, the star on the flag recalled the 1836 California Lone Star Flag. Todd, in an 1878 letter to the Los Angeles Express, states that the star was drawn using blackberry juice and in recognition of the California Lone Star Flag. The bear was designed to be a symbol of strength and unyielding resistance.

According to the Sonoma State Historic Park, the construction of the flag was described as such:

The original Bear Flag and the republic it symbolized had a brief career, from about June 14 until July 9. On July 7, 1846, Commodore John Drake Sloat of the United States Navy's Pacific Squadron first raised the 28-star American flag at Monterey, the capital of Alta California, and claimed the territory for the United States.

Two days later, on July 9, 1846, Navy Lieutenant Joseph Warren Revere arrived in Sonoma and hauled down the Bear Flag, running up in its place the Stars and Stripes. The Bear Flag was given to young John E. Montgomery (son of Commander John B. Montgomery of ), who would later write in a letter to his mother "Cuffy came down growling"—"Cuffy" being his nickname for the bear on the flag.

The Bear Flag given to young Montgomery returned with USS Portsmouth to the east coast of the U.S. in 1848, but in 1855 was returned to California. The flag was given to California's two senators, John B. Weller and William M. Gwin. This flag was donated to the Society of California Pioneers on September 8, 1855, and was preserved at the Society's Pioneer Halls in San Francisco until it was destroyed on April 18, 1906, in the fires that followed the great San Francisco earthquake. Today, a replica hangs on display in the Sonoma Barracks, or El Presidio de Sonoma. There is also a statue in the plaza at Sonoma, California, commemorating the raising of the flag, the Bear Flag Monument.

The Civil War period 
During the secession crisis and the early part of the American Civil War in 1861, California was divided between supporters of the union and supporters of southern secession. In the months leading up to the war some opposed to the government in Los Angeles County and San Bernardino County showed support for secession by flying variants of the Bear Flag instead of the Stars and Stripes.

During the war, Union soldiers protected the West against secessionists who ran up Confederate flags in many places, including above the California statehouse in Sacramento, then disappearing before they could be caught. On July 4, 1861, during U.S. Independence Day celebrations in Sacramento, Democrat and veteran Maj. J. P. Gillis celebrated the independence of the United States from Great Britain and the secession of the Confederacy by unfurling a flag based on the first Confederate flag, the Stars and Bars, but containing seventeen stars rather than the Confederate banner's seven, and marching down the street to the cheers of pro-slavery individuals. This was the only Confederate flag captured in California during the Civil War. Unionist Jack Biderman denounced Gillis, tore the flag from his hands, and taunted secessionists to try to take the flag back. No one tried. Because Gillis' flag was seized by Jack Biderman, it is referred to either as the "Biderman Flag" or the "Gillis Flag."

Flag of the governor

The flag of the governor of California consists of the seal of California centered on a field of azure. Like many other U.S. governors' flags, there are four five-point stars at the corners of the field.

See also

 List of California state symbols
 List of flags by design
 List of U.S. state, district, and territorial insignia

References

Further reading

External links
 
 Hubert H. Bancroft's History of California,Vol. V.   1846-1848
 Creation of the Bear Flag.
 Flags of the World: California
 The Bear Flag Museum
 William Todd Quote on Bear Flag construction

Symbols of California
California
Flags of California
1911 establishments in California
California
California
Bears in art